Peace to Luhanshchyna is the largest political movement in the Lugansk People's Republic (LPR), with more than 104,000 people in its ranks and the most seats in the People's Council.

The movement's president is Leonid Pasechnik, the incumbent Head of the Luhansk People's Republic. Until the Russian annexation (LPR), it supported the republic being an independent country with close diplomatic ties to Russia.

Electoral results

Head

People's Council

References

External links
 

2014 establishments in Ukraine
2014 pro-Russian unrest in Ukraine
Banned political parties in Ukraine
Banned secessionist parties
Eurosceptic parties in Ukraine
Political parties established in 2014
Political parties in the Luhansk People's Republic
Russian nationalism in Ukraine
Russian political parties in Ukraine
Secessionist organizations in Europe
Separatism in Ukraine
Anti-Americanism